Herb Schumm (September 11, 1942 – June 28, 1985) was a Canadian football player with the Canadian Football League's Edmonton Eskimos and the Calgary Stampeders. Schumm spent his entire 10-year CFL career as an offensive lineman and defensive lineman for the Eskimos and Stampeders. He was a part of the Stampeders Grey Cup victory in 1971. His brother Howie Schumm also played in the CFL.

References

External links
Eskimos All-Time Team

1942 births
1985 deaths
Calgary Stampeders players
Canadian football defensive linemen
Canadian football offensive linemen
Edmonton Elks players
People from Spruce Grove
Players of Canadian football from Alberta